Kyriakos Stamatopoulos (born 28 August 1979) is a Greek Canadian former football goalkeeper who is the head goalkeeper coach for AIK.

He is nicknamed "Stam" and he is also often referred to as Kenny Stamatopoulos.

Early life
Stamatopoulos moved with his family from Greece to Ontario when he was a small child. He started playing ice hockey at the age of 2 in Canada and only picked up football at the age of 13.

Club career

Sweden
Stamatopoulos' clubs were relegated every year he played with them in Sweden. First Enköping twice in a row, then Boden while he was on loan there. His relegation-run did not end before he moved to Norway.

Tromsø
His career at Tromsø got off to a rough start, after he was given a two-match suspension for his involvement in a group fight, which he described as "a little hockey brawl" that occurred during his debut match against Molde. He became a fan favourite as a result of this incident.

On loan

Toronto FC
On 3 August 2007 it was announced that Canada's Toronto FC manager Mo Johnston had loaned Stamatopoulos in the middle of their "keeper crisis". He made his debut against Los Angeles Galaxy on 5 August.

Lyn
In April 2009, Stamatopoulos was loaned out from Tromsø to Lyn.

Fredrikstad
On 20 July 2009, it was announced that Stamatopoulos joined Fredrikstad on loan for the rest of the season. Stamatopoulos will join the club 1 August, and make his debut for Fredrikstad 2 August, at home against Viking.

AIK
Stamatopoulos signed a season-long loan deal with the reigning Swedish champions on 6 March 2010. AIK's goalkeeper Nicklas Bergh became injured during the pre-season, leaving the team with only one goalkeeper. Stamatopoulos made his debut with the club in the quarterfinal of Svenska Cupen in July 2010 against Helsingborgs IF. He only let in one goal in the 1–1 draw, but AIK lost in the penalty shootout.

He became first choice following the tragic death of Ivan Turina in May 2013, but was subsequently the club's second-choice goalkeeper.

On 22 November 2017 AIK announced they prolonged Stamatopoulos's contract until 31 December 2020. In addition, he was appointed as head goalkeeping coach for the club and would continue to be registered as a player in the squad.

Career statistics

International career
Stamatopoulos was a member of the under-23 national team in July 2001 at Jeux de la Francophonie.

He made his senior debut for Canada in a November 2001 friendly match against Malta. His last cap came in 2016. In total, he made 21 caps.

References

External links

  
  
 
 
 

1979 births
Living people
Soccer people from Ontario
Canadian people of Greek descent
Greek emigrants to Canada
Naturalized citizens of Canada
Association football goalkeepers
Canadian soccer players
Canada men's international soccer players
2002 CONCACAF Gold Cup players
2009 CONCACAF Gold Cup players
2015 CONCACAF Gold Cup players
Canadian expatriate soccer players
Canadian expatriate sportspeople in Norway
Canadian expatriate sportspeople in Sweden
Greek footballers
AIK Fotboll players
Kalamata F.C. players
Bodens BK players
Tromsø IL players
Toronto FC players
Lyn Fotball players
Fredrikstad FK players
Eliteserien players
Major League Soccer players
Expatriate footballers in Sweden
Expatriate footballers in Norway
Allsvenskan players
Canada men's under-23 international soccer players
Allsvenskan managers
Greek football managers